Hawala or hewala (meaning transfer or sometimes trust), originating in India as havala, also known as  in Persian, and  or  in Somali, is a popular and informal value transfer system based on the performance and honour of a huge network of money brokers (known as hawaladars). They operate outside of, or parallel to, traditional banking, financial channels and remittance systems. The system requires a minimum of two  hawaladars that take care of the "transaction" without the movement of cash or telegraphic transfer. While hawaladars are spread throughout the world, they are primarily located in the Middle East, North Africa, the Horn of Africa and the Indian subcontinent. Hawala follows Islamic traditions but its use is not limited to Muslims.

Origins 
The hawala system originated in India. Hawala as a legal concept came to be described as early as 1327, according to Schramm and Taube, though the actual practice has existed since the 8th century between Indian, Arab and Muslim traders who operated alongside the Silk Road and beyond , as a protection against theft. It is believed to have arisen in the financing of long-distance trade around the emerging capital trade centers in the early medieval period. In South Asia, it appears to have developed into a fully-fledged money market instrument, which was only gradually replaced by the instruments of the formal banking system in the first half of the 20th century.

"Hawala" itself influenced the development of the agency in common law and in civil laws, such as the aval in French law and :pt:aval Portuguese law, and the avallo in Italian law. The words aval and avallo were themselves derived from hawala. The transfer of debt, which was "not permissible under Roman law but became widely practiced in medieval Europe, especially in commercial transactions", was due to the large extent of the "trade conducted by the Italian cities with the Muslim world in the Middle Ages". The agency was also "an institution unknown to Roman law" as no "individual could conclude a binding contract on behalf of another as his agent". In Roman law, the "contractor himself was considered the party to the contract and it took a second contract between the person who acted on behalf of a principal and the latter in order to transfer the rights and the obligations deriving from the contract to him". On the other hand, Islamic law and the later common law "had no difficulty in accepting agency as one of its institutions in the field of contracts and of obligations in general".

How it works 
In the most basic variant of the hawala system, money is transferred via a network of hawala brokers, or hawaladars. It is the transfer of money without actually moving it. In fact, a successful definition of the hawala system that is used is "money transfer without money movement".  According to the author Sam Vaknin, there are large hawaladar operators with networks of middlemen in cities across many countries, but most hawaladars are small businesses who work at hawala as a sideline or moonlighting operation.

The figure shows how hawala works: (1) a customer (A, left-hand side) approaches a hawala broker (X) in one city and gives a sum of money (red arrow) that is to be transferred to a recipient (B, right-hand side) in another, usually foreign, city. Along with the money, he usually specifies something like a password that will lead to the money being paid out (blue arrows). (2b) The hawala broker X calls another hawala broker M in the recipient's city, and informs M about the agreed password, or gives other disposition of the funds. Then, the intended recipient (B), who also has been informed by A about the password (2a), now approaches M and tells him the agreed password (3a). If the password is correct, then M releases the transferred sum to B (3b), usually minus a small commission. X now owes M the money that M had paid out to B; thus M has to trust Xs promise to settle the debt at a later date.

The unique feature of the system is that no promissory instruments are exchanged between the hawala brokers; the transaction takes place entirely on the honour system. As the system does not depend on the legal enforceability of claims, it can operate even in the absence of a legal and juridical environment. Trust and extensive use of connections are the components that distinguish it from other remittance systems. Hawaladar networks are often based on membership in the same family, village, clan or ethnic group, and cheating is punished by effective excommunication and the loss of honour, which lead to severe economic hardship.

Informal records are produced of individual transactions, and a running tally of the amount owed by one broker to another is kept. Settlements of debts between hawala brokers can take a variety of forms (such as goods, services, properties, transfers of employees, etc.), and need not take the form of direct cash transactions.

In addition to commissions, hawala brokers often earn their profits through bypassing official exchange rates. Generally, the funds enter the system in the source country's currency and leave the system in the recipient country's currency. As settlements often take place without any foreign exchange transactions, they can be made at other than official exchange rates.

Hawala is attractive to customers because it provides a fast and convenient transfer of funds, usually with a far lower commission than that charged by banks. Its advantages are most pronounced when the receiving country applies unprofitable exchange rate regulations or when the banking system in the receiving country is less complex (e.g., due to differences in legal environment in places such as Afghanistan, Yemen, Somalia). Moreover, in some parts of the world, it is the only option for legitimate fund transfers. It has been used even by aid organizations in areas in which it is the best-functioning institution.

Regional variants 
Dubai has been prominent for decades as a welcoming hub for hawala transactions worldwide.

South Asia

Hundis 

The hundi is a financial instrument that developed on the Indian sub-continent for use in trade and credit transactions. Hundis are used as a form of remittance instrument to transfer money from place to place, as a form of credit instrument or IOU to borrow money and as a bill of exchange in trade transactions. The Reserve Bank of India describes the Hundi as "an unconditional order in writing made by a person directing another to pay a certain sum of money to a person named in the order."

Horn of Africa 
According to the CIA, with the dissolution of Somalia's formal banking system, many informal money transfer operators arose to fill the void.  It estimates that such hawaladars, xawilaad or xawala brokers are now responsible for the transfer of up to $1.6 billion per year in remittances to the country, most coming from working Somalis outside Somalia. Such funds have in turn had a stimulating effect on local business activity.

West Africa 
The 2012 Tuareg rebellion left Northern Mali without an official money transfer service for months. The coping mechanisms that appeared were patterned on the hawala system.

See also 

 Economy related
 Global ranking of remittance by nations
 Remittances to India
 Informal value transfer system
 FATF

 Related contemporary issues
 Jizya
 Zakat
 Riba
 FATF blacklist
 Terrorism financing

References

Further reading 
 , exploring the operation of contemporary hawala networks, and the role they play in the transmission of migrant workers' remittances from Europe to South Asia.
 .
 .
 .
 
 .
 .
 .

Informal value transfer systems
Remittances
Payment systems
Islamic financial contracts